San Pedro de Curahuara Municipality is the first municipal section of the Gualberto Villarroel Province in the  La Paz Department, Bolivia. Its seat is San Pedro de Curahuara. It had 8,858 inhabitants in 2010.

Villages 
In addition to San Pedro de Curahuara, the municipality also comprises hamlets, among which:

 Araj Huma
 Chilahuala

References 

  Instituto Nacional de Estadistica de Bolivia  (INE)

Municipalities of La Paz Department (Bolivia)